Catopta kendevanensis is a moth in the family Cossidae. It was described by Franz Daniel in 1937. It is found in Iran and Afghanistan.

Subspecies
Catopta kendevanensis kendevanensis (northern and central Iran)
Catopta kendevanensis anjumanica Daniel, 1964 (north-eastern and central Afghanistan)

References

Moths described in 1937
Catoptinae